Venezuelan rum is a protected designation of origin, granted by the SAPI since 2003, to the rum brands of Venezuela that meet certain quality and origin requirements.

Requirements of designation
The Venezuelan rum designation forbids the alteration of the mixture of rum by use of substances that provide artificial color, flavor or aroma. These requirements also include the rum having, in the entirety of its components, a minimum of two years spent aging in white oak barrels and at least 40% anhydrous alcohol, and that none of the raw materials are mixed with molasses nor alcohol from other countries

This denomination allows to differentiate Venezuelan rums from those of the rest of the world.

List of brands 
The rum brands with this designation are:

 Ron Diplomático
 Ron Santa Teresa
 Ron Roble Viejo
 Ron Carúpano
 Ron Pampero
 Ron Cacique
 Ron Ocumare
 Ron Veroes
 Ron El Muco
 Ron Cañaveral
 Ron Estelar De Luxe
 Ron Tepuy
 Ron Bodega 1800
 Ron Quimera
 Ron Añejo Barrica
 Ron Calazan
 Ron Caballo Viejo

References 

 
Rums
Products with protected designation of origin